Christine Campbell is the name of:

 Christine Campbell (character), title character in sitcom The New Adventures of Old Christine, portrayed by Julia Louis-Dreyfus
 Christine Campbell (politician) (born 1953), Labor member of the Victorian Legislative Assembly
 Christine Campbell (rower) (born 1964), American silver medallist at the 1987 World Rowing Championships
 Christine Campbell (singer), British soprano

See also 

 Christine Campbell Thomson (1897–1985), British horror fiction writer